The Men of the Midlands was a professional invitational snooker tournament held for two editions in various locations around England in 1972 and 1973. Both tournaments were won by Alex Higgins.

The 1972 edition featured eight players in two groups each playing the other once with the top two in each group progressing to the semi finals. In the 1973 edition there were four players who played each other twice. The top two then met in the final.

Winners

References

Snooker non-ranking competitions
Snooker competitions in England
Recurring sporting events established in 1972
Recurring events disestablished in 1973
1972 establishments in England
Defunct snooker competitions
Defunct sports competitions in England